Jean Lamarche (born 1972) is a Canadian politician. He currently serves as the mayor of Trois-Rivières, Quebec.

Lamarche was elected as mayor in a by-election on May 5, 2019, winning 55% of the vote. He had been endorsed by the previous mayor, Yves Lévesque who resigned due to health reasons. Prior to being elected, he worked in the communications office for the Ministry of Transportation and was the president of FestiVoix, a local music festival. He has a social communications degree from the Université du Québec à Trois-Rivières and worked for Radio-Canada Mauricie as a researcher and assistant director from 2006 to 2008. He is also the co-founder and former publisher of the La Galère, a community newspaper. 

As mayor, Lamarche has had to deal with the COVID-19 pandemic in Quebec, the future of Colisée Vidéotron, reorganization of Société de transport de Trois-Rivières bus routes, a lack of indoor pools and criticism from city councillors for keeping them out of the decision making process. On council, he has lost some major votes including a grant for the Trois-Rivières Aigles baseball team, and a grant for the Grand Prix of Trois-Rivières. Despite his opposition on council, he is seen as being more willing to listen than Lévesque.

References

Living people
Mayors of Trois-Rivières
1972 births
Université du Québec à Trois-Rivières alumni
Canadian newspaper publishers (people)